The 2012 Southern 100 held between Monday 9 July and Thursday 12 July on the 4.25-mile Billown Circuit near Castletown, Isle of Man.

Results

Practice Times

Practice Times & Leaderboard Superbike
Monday 9 July 2012 First Practice Session Billown Course

Race Results

Race 10; 2012 Southern 100 Races Solo Championship final standings
Thursday 12 July 2012 9 laps – 42.50 miles Billown Circuit 

Fastest Lap and New Course Record: Michael Dunlop, 2' 14.702 113.584 mph on lap 6

Sources

External links

Motorsport in the Isle of Man
Southern 100
Southern
South